Kato Stefanina is a village of the Volvi municipality. Before the 2011 local government reform it was part of the municipality of Arethousa. The 2011 census recorded 19 inhabitants in the village. Kato Stefanina is a part of the community of Stefanina.

See also
 List of settlements in the Thessaloniki regional unit

References

Populated places in Thessaloniki (regional unit)